Leessang of Honey Family is the debut album by South Korean hip-hop duo Leessang. The album was released on June 27, 2002. The album contains 16 songs.

Track listing

References

2002 debut albums
Korean-language albums
Leessang albums